James or Jim Ball may refer to:

James Ball (cyclist) (born 1991), Welsh Paralympic cyclist
James Ball (economist) (1933–2018), emeritus professor of economics at London Business School
Jimmy Ball (football manager) (born 1975 or 1976), English football manager
James Ball (footballer) (born 1995), English footballer
James Ball (journalist), British investigative journalist and author
James Dyer Ball (1847–1919), sinologist
James Presley Ball (1825–1904), African-American daguerreotypist, abolitionist, and businessman
James W. Ball (born 1939), U.S. Army General and 24th Chief of Ordnance
Jim Ball (baseball) (1884–1963), Major League Baseball player
Jim Ball (radio personality), Australian radio personality
Jimmy Ball (1903–1988), Canadian athlete